Pelloux is a surname. Notable people with the surname include:

Luigi Pelloux (1839–1924), Italian general and politician
Patrick Pelloux (born 1963), French physician and activist